Nymphargus luminosus is a species of frog in the family Centrolenidae, formerly placed in Cochranella.
It is endemic to Colombia.
Its natural habitats are subtropical or tropical moist montane forests and rivers.
It is threatened by habitat loss.

References

luminosus
Amphibians of Colombia
Taxonomy articles created by Polbot
Amphibians described in 1995